Moro per amore is a 1681 opera by Alessandro Stradella to a libretto by Flavio Orsini last duke of Bracciano. It was scheduled for Genoa's Teatro Falcone in 1681, but was not given a public performance to 1695, thirteen years after the composer's death.

Recordings
Moro per amore, cond. Estevan Velardi, Bongiovanni

References

Operas
1681 operas
Operas by Alessandro Stradella